Apoctena pictoriana is a species of moth of the family Tortricidae. It is found in New Zealand, where it is found on both the North and South islands.

The larvae feed on Nothofagus species.

References

Moths described in 1875
Epitymbiini
Moths of New Zealand